Geoff Watt (died 1969) was a local distance runner from Warragul, Victoria of some international note who died from exposure in 1969 while training on Mount Erica in Baw Baw National Park.

 Major force behind Warragul Amateur Athletics Club.
 First to run up and down Mount Kilimanjaro.
 Father to Kathy Watt - Olympic cycling champion
The athletics track in Warragul is named in honour of Geoff Watt.

External links 
 The Age - 8 Aug 1962
 AOC Kathy Watt profile
 Leunig & Farmer Eyecare

1969 deaths
People from Warragul
Year of birth missing
Sportsmen from Victoria (Australia)
Australian runners